The year 673 BC was a year of the pre-Julian Roman calendar. In the Roman Empire, it was known as year 81 Ab urbe condita . The denomination 673 BC for this year has been used since the early medieval period, when the Anno Domini calendar era became the prevalent method in Europe for naming years.

Events

By place

Rome 

 Tullus Hostilius becomes king of Rome.

Births

Deaths

References